Augustin Grégoire Pesnon (born 31 March 1988) is a French classical guitarist, filmmaker and founder of Paris Guitar Foundation. Born in Clamart, France, he spent most of his childhood in Évreux, a city in the northern part of France. He spent 2 years studying guitar at the National University of Music in Bucharest, Romania, under the wings of Catalin Stefanescu before finally returning to France and continued his study at the Ecole Normale de Musique de Paris Alfred Cortot.

In 2014, he founded a non-profit foundation for classical guitarists called Paris Guitar Foundation which still operates until today. The foundation currently has more than 19,000 followers on its Facebook page and more than 2,500 subscribers on its YouTube channel.

Early life 

Pesnon was born on 31 March 1988 in Clamart, France in a family that is heavily involved with music. His mother, Christine Prud'homme teaches kindergarten in a school 30 km outside of Évreux, France and his father Pierre Pesnon is a retired rock guitarist businessman in dog breeding. His maternal grandfather, Jean Prud'homme was an active church organist and pianist during his life. He has a younger sister, named Jade.

Pesnon first picked up his guitar at the age of 5 and started learning intensively under the supervision of his father. He attended Conservatoire d’Évreux where he met Arnaud Dumond at the age of 9. This encounter deeply affected his style and sound in the guitar playing.

Interested in the guitar school of East Europe, he pursued his education at National University of Music in Bucharest (NUMB) under the wings of Catalin Stefanescu where he learned a rigorous technical education.

After he returned to France, he continued his study with Alberto Ponce at l’Ecole Normale de Musique de Paris Alfred Cortot.

He earned his Diplome  Superieur de Musique de Chambre under the class of Genevieve Martigny and Devy Erlih, including a license diploma in musicology of University Paris-Sorbonne and the Diplome National Superieur Professionel de Musicien du Pole Superieur Paris/Boulogne-Billancourt.

Career 
In 2007, the young guitarist collaborated with the conductor Dorel Pascu-Radulescu, and the Bucharest Symphony Orchestra in the Mauro Giuliani, “Guitar Concerto major, Op. 30”.

In 2011, he signed a contract with a Parisian label, Logik Production 36 and released his first album, Aurora. Supported by the foundation of Forum Musical de Normandie and The Rotary Club, he benefitted the advices from Gérard Abiton, Denis Azabagic, Gabriel Bianco, Zoran Dukic, Jeremy Jouve, Adam Del Monte, Remy Jousselme, Carlo Marchione, and Judicael Perroy.

In 2014, he founded Paris Guitar Foundation, a Paris-based non-profit organisation that support the world of classical guitarists. During one of his interviews, he said that he got the idea of the foundation while he was in the shower. Up until today the foundation has generated more than 19,000 followers on its Facebook page and more than 2,500 subscribers on its YouTube channel. Today the foundation has 6 members, including guitarist Pierre Bibault, journalist Florent Passamonti and photographer, Hervé Milliard.

In 2016, he started Sunday Live Concert, a private concert with max. 15 people as the audience, where he invited well known and talented guitarists all over the world to perform a 1-hour concert and live-streamed the concert through Paris Guitar Foundation's Facebook page. For every concert, a student of famous guitar teachers in Paris has the opportunity to open for the main act. The first concert was held on 18 September 2016 and starred Gabriel Bianco. Other than Bianco, Xavier Jara, Duo Solaris, Rafael Aguirre, and Samuelito also performed in the concerts too.

In 2016, he started a teaching position at the Conservatoire de Châtillon and the Conservatoire d'Asnières-sur-Seine.

In 2018, he started a full time teaching position at the Conservatoire à Rayonnement Intercommunal de Viroflay under the same management of Conservatoire à Rayonnement Régional de Versailles Grand Parc.

Pesnon gained recognition and success through the 10 international competition he has won so far, most notably the Thailand International Guitar Festival, Nuits Musicales de Cieux, Calcutta International Classical Guitar Festival & Competition, and Gitarrenfestival Nordhorn. He performs regularly in countries such as Germany, Austria, UAE, India, Italy, Japan, Romania, and also Thailand.

In 2019, together with his friends Stanislas Kuchinsky, a contrabassist, and Vitier Vivas, a percussionist, they formed a trio that play pieces inspired by Spanish music.

Pesnon plays on a Greg Smallman guitar and is both a Karura and D'Addario Artist.

Charity project 
In 2015, he organised a charity project for the Nagaland Guitar Society where he invites people to donate money, strings, books, guitar equipments, etc.

Personal life 
Pesnon resided in the 17th arrondissement of Paris, France from 2016 until 2020, and used his residence as the headquarter of Paris Guitar Foundation.

He currently resides in the suburb of Chaville 13 km from the center of Paris with his wife.

References 

1988 births
Living people
People from Clamart
École Normale de Musique de Paris alumni
French classical guitarists
French male guitarists
21st-century French musicians
21st-century guitarists
21st-century French male musicians